Metaterpna is a genus of moths in the family Geometridae described by Yazaki in 1992.

Species
Metaterpna differens (Warren, 1909)
Metaterpna thyatiraria (Oberthür, 1913) (=Dindica thyatiroides Sterneck, 1928)

References

External links

Pseudoterpnini